Ondres is a commune in the Landes department in Nouvelle-Aquitaine in southwestern France. It is only two miles from the nearest beach (Ondres plage), which is well known for being a good surfing spot.

Population

Culture
Ondres is the home town of architectural drafter/painter Dominique Duplantier, graduated from the École des Beaux-Arts of Paris, who draw the traditional habitats as well as landscapes, of the Basque Country and southwest France. He is the father of Joe and Mario of the heavy metal band Gojira, and of the photographer Gabrielle Duplantier.

See also
Communes of the Landes department

References

Communes of Landes (department)